Abdulla Pashew, or , is a contemporary Kurdish poet. He was born in 1946 in Hewlêr, Iraqi Kurdistan. He studied at the Teachers' Training Institute in Hewlêr (Erbil), and participated in the Foundation Congress of the Kurdish Writers' Union in Baghdad in 1970. In 1973 he went to the former Soviet Union, and in 1979 he received an M.A. in pedagogy with a specialisation in foreign languages. In 1984 he was granted a PhD in Philology from the Institute of Oriental Studies of the USSR Academy of Sciences. For the next five years he was a professor at al-Fatih University in Tripoli, Libya. He has lived in Finland since 1995. He was a refugee until 1997. 

He published his first poem in 1963 and his first collection in 1967. Since then he has published eight collections. The latest, Berew Zerdeper (Towards the Twilight), was published in Sweden in 2001. He is fluent in English and Russian and has translated the works of Walt Whitman and Alexandr Pushkin into Kurdish.

Notes

External links 
 

1946 births
Living people
Iraqi Kurdish poets
21st-century Kurdish writers
Iraqi expatriates in the Soviet Union
20th-century Iraqi poets
20th-century male writers
21st-century Iraqi poets
21st-century male writers
People from Erbil
Academic staff of the University of Tripoli